Meghana is an Indian feminine given name and an occasional surname. It may refer to
Meghana Erande (born 1981), Indian actress 
Meghana Gaonkar (born 1987), Indian actress 
Meghana Jakkampudi (born 1995), Indian badminton player
Meghana Narayan (born 1977), Indian swimmer
Meghana Raj, Indian actress 

Surname
Sabbhineni Meghana (born 1996), Indian cricketer

See also
Meghna (disambiguation)
Meghan, Welsh female name

Indian feminine given names